The Mount Lebanon revolts of 752 and 759 were a series of anti-Abbasid revolts by the Christian inhabitants of Lebanon as a response to the Abbasid oppression of the region. The first of these revolts began in the year 752 under the Mardaite prince Elias of Baskinta. Elias battled the Arabs in many parts of the Beqaa Valley but ultimately met his fate in a town now named after him known as Qabb Ilyas. However the Christians were not discouraged and a new leader known as Simon continued the rebellion, almost taking Homs and Hama of Syria with the support of the Byzantine navy. A second rebellion, commonly known as the Munayṭirah Revolt, occurred in 759 when a man known as Bandar (or Theodore in some sources) declared himself king over all of the Mardaites. Salih ibn Ali, the uncle of the Abbasid caliph, ambushed Bandar near Baalbek and defeated him. After this the Caliph migrated several Arab tribes to the Christian regions forcing the expulsion of many from their native villages.

Background
In the year 750 the Abbasids overthrew the Umayyad Caliphate and took most of its former territories. This included parts of modern-day Lebanon such as the Beqaa Valley. Unlike their predecessors who were more tolerant towards the Christians of Lebanon, at least since Maronite-Byzantine relations deteriorated, the Abbasids were harsh towards the Lebanese Christians harassing and heavily taxing them.

Baskinta revolt
In the year 752 a Mardaite prince known as Elias of Baskinta began to raid the Beqaa region as a response to the oppression of the Abbasids. Elias set up base in a town known as al-Muruj and turned it into his headquarters assuming control of the Beqaa. When the Abbsaid caliph As-Saffah heard about this he sent an envoy bringing a robe of honor and the two sides sat to eat together. However, Elias became drunk and infatuated with a dancing maiden which caused his captains to lose their confidence in him and abandon him. Unbeknownst to Elias or his men, a group of soldiers were following the envoys and attacked Elias while he was drunk, killing him and many of his men. The soldiers then set  al-Muruj on fire and retook control of the Beqaa. Elias was buried in this town and it came to be known as Qabb Ilyas which is derived from Qabr Elias meaning "grave of Elias". A Roman wayside shrine carved into a rock above the town is popularly considered to be the grave of the prince.

However, not all of the Mardaites were discouraged as a new leader called Simon took control and pushed the Abbasid armies back, going as far as almost taking Homs and Hama through aid from the Byzantine navy.

Munayṭirah revolt
In the year 759 people in Lebanon began to rebel against the kharaj tax collector of Baalbek. A youthful mountaineer of huge physique named Bandar, or Theodore in some sources, led the uprising from the Munayṭirah mountain region and declared himself king over all of the Mardaites. The uncle of the caliph Salih ibn Ali, who was also a general of the Abbasid army, raised many men to confront Bandar. The two sides met and casualties were high on both sides but the Abbasids eventually ambushed and routed the Christians on their way to Baalbek, with Bandar fleeing to Tripoli (which was under Byzantine control) leaving his companions to be massacred.

Aftermath
Salih then began a reign of terror against the Christians in the region, targeting rebels and dhimmis alike. Many Christians were slaughtered or forced to flee their homes in exile. However, not all Muslims supported this persecution of the Christians including the imam  al-Awza'i who criticized Salih for his commands stating:

To ensure that similar revolts would not take place Al-Mansur sent Arab tribes such as the Tanukhids and Lakhmids to emigrate and settle in Lebanon. The Arab tribes mostly settled south of Beirut in the mountainous and coastal areas notably blocking off the Afqa corridor from Maronites which was their access to the coastline. This also prevented the Byzantines from sending their ships to the region. This tactic proved effective as the Arabs successfully fended off two Mardaite raids in 791 and 875.

Some of the Arab families that migrated to Lebanon during this period would become prominent dynasties such as the Arslans, Buhturids, and Abi'l-Lama's.

See also
 8th century in Lebanon
 Revolt of Tyre (996–998)
 Byzantine–Arab wars (780–1180)

References

750s conflicts
8th-century rebellions
Arab–Byzantine wars
History of the Maronites
Medieval Lebanon
Rebellions against the Abbasid Caliphate
8th century in the Abbasid Caliphate